On January 7, 2023, Tyre Nichols, a 29-year-old Black man, was stopped by police in Memphis, Tennessee by the MPD SCORPION unit. Officers pulled Nichols from his car, and they maced and tasered him. Nichols broke free and ran toward his mother's house, which was less than a mile away. Five Black officers caught up with Nichols near the house, where they assaulted and beat him. He was admitted to the hospital in critical condition, where he died three days later.

The officers reported that they stopped Nichols for reckless driving. MPD released four edited video clips from police body cameras and a nearby Skycop camera. Police Chief Cerelyn "C. J." Davis stated, "We've looked at cameras. We've looked at body-worn cameras. Even if something occurred prior to this stop, we've been unable to substantiate it. We've taken a pretty extensive look to determine what that probable cause was and we have not been able to substantiate that. It doesn't mean that something didn't happen, but there's no proof."

Both the Tennessee Bureau of Investigation and the United States Department of Justice opened investigations. A coroner's report has not been released. 

An attorney representing Nichols' family, stated that a private autopsy found Nichols experienced "extensive bleeding caused by a severe beating".

The five officers were terminated from the MPD, effective January 8, 2023. They were arrested and charged on January 26 with several crimes including second degree murder of Nichols. They have all pled not guilty. The MPD has disciplined, relieved of duty, dismissed, or arrested, thirteen officers in total regarding their conduct. Memphis Fire Services, terminated three employees for their failure to evaluate or assist Nichols. After the release of the videos, widespread protests began on January 27.

People involved

Tyre Nichols 

Tyre Deandre Nichols (June 5, 1993January 10, 2023) was a 29-year-old Black man. Nichols worked for FedEx, and was an amateur photographer with a photography website.

Nichols was raised in Sacramento, California, and moved to Memphis in 2020.

Police officers 

The five Black Memphis Police Department (MPD) officers accused of beating Nichols in connection to the traffic stop each had two to six years of police experience.

 Tadarrius Bean, 24, hired in August 2020
 Demetrius Haley, 30, hired in August 2020 (a former corrections officer; first officer at initial traffic stop)
 Emmitt Martin III, 30, hired in March 2018 (second officer at initial traffic stop)
 Desmond Mills Jr., 32, hired in March 2017 (a former jailer in Mississippi and Tennessee)
 Justin Smith, 28, hired in March 2018.

Four out of the five officers had prior disciplinary actions by MPD for various offenses. All five were members of an MPD 30-person specialized hot spot policing unit known as SCORPION (street crimes operation to restore peace in our neighborhoods).

Officer DeWayne Smith 
MPD conducted an internal investigation of 25-year veteran officer Lt. DeWayne Smith, who arrived on the As the senior officer and supervisor, it was found that he failed to "take command" of the situation. Smith retired with benefits on March 1, 2023. A disciplinary hearing was held on March 2, 2023. Smith did not attend the hearing, and would have been reprimanded and fired had he not retired on the previous day.

The decertification documents showed that Smith violated department policy, did not wear his required bodycam, failed to offer or provide proper medical care, and inappropriately told the family of Nichols that he was stopped and under arrest for driving under the influence, without evidence to support the claim.

SCORPION Unit

SCORPION was assembled by Memphis Police Chief Cerelyn J. Davis, in October 2021, to deal with serious crimes; Davis disbanded SCORPION wake of Nichols death. SCORPION unit officers drove unmarked cars and many dressed in plainclothes and wore bulletproof vests marked "Police".

SCORPION has been compared to the "RED DOG" unit Davis commanded in 2006 and 2007 as a member of the Altanta, Georgia police department. Davis described the Red Dog as utilizing "aggressive crime fighting strategies in high crime areas citywide", unit was disbanded in 2011 after the city agreed to settle a lawsuit regarding excessive force by Red Dog officers. NBC News reported that a former member of Atlanta Civilian Review Board, said it should have been clear to Davis that a tactical unit like Scorpion was prone to violating people’s rights in Memphis just as Red Dog did in Atlanta.

Traffic stop and death 

Nichols was two minutes away from his home when he was stopped by MPD at 8:24p.m. on January7, 2023. Officers Haley, Martin, and Preston Hemphill conducted the initial stop of Nichols' at the intersection East Raines Road and Ross Road, with police vehicles surrounding his car on three sides. The body-worn camera footage released by the City of Memphis on January 27, does not "show any activity earlier than an officer responding to a stop in progress ..."

Haley and Martin were at the traffic stop when Hemphill arrived at  8:24p.m.  By 8:25p.m., Haley pulled Nichols out of his car as Nichols said: "I didn't do anything." An officer shouted: "Get on the fuckin' ground" and moments later a officer shouted "I'm gonna tase your ass." Officers pushed Nichols to the ground. At about 8:25:45 p.m., Nichols was laying on his side in the road - an officer had Nichols left hand, a second officer had Nichols right hand, a third officer held a taser against Nichols left leg while also using his right hand to hold Nichols to the ground. From the moment that Nichols was pulled from the car, to being held on the ground, Officers simultaneously yelled numerous commands, threats, expletives, and made "assaultive comments" at him. While being held on the ground an Officer continued to yell for Nichols to lay down. Nichols responded "I am on the ground". An Officer yelled back "Lay on your stomach". Moments later, Haley, deployed pepper spray against Nichols, which hit several of the other officers. Nichols broke free and began to run. Hemphill, against regulations, deployed his taser at Nichols. At 8:26p.m., Nichols began running south on Ross Road, as he was pursued by at least two officers. Two more police units arrived at the scene around 8:29p.m. Footage showed that one officer who remained at the area of the traffic stop said, "I hope they stomp his ass".

At 8:33p.m., Officers Bean, Mills, and Smith caught up to Nichols and had him on the ground at Castlegate Lane and Bear Creek which is approximately a half a mile away from the original traffic stop. Footage from a pole-mounted Skycop CCTV camera showed an officer using his leg to push Nichols hard to the ground. Between 8:33p.m. and 8:36p.m. Nichols was punched, then pepper sprayed a second time,  then kick in upper torso numerous by a fourth officer, then an officer can be heard yelling "I'm going to baton the fuck out of you." before striking Nichols several times with a baton, then punched five times in the face by one officer. The video footage showed officers had control of Nichols arms when he was struck with the baton, kicked, and successively punched in the face 5 times. A fifth officer arrives, as Nichols is on the ground and in the process of being handcuffed, and kicks him in the upper torso, which is follow by another kick to the upper torso by another officer. Fox News reported that, in the videos, "Nichols can be heard calling out to his mother before police beat him into a daze". Nichols conduct has been described as resisting and non-violent there is no indication that he struck back at the officers.

By 8:37 p.m., Nichols was handcuffed and limp; officers propped him against the side of a police car. After Nichols was on the ground, the involved officers convened and shared their stories about the arrest. In the body-worn camera footage, Michael Ruiz of Fox News reported, "officers can be heard discussing his alleged driving, 'swerving' and nearly hitting one of them". One officer bragged: "I was hitting him with straight haymakers, dog", while another exclaimed: "I jumped in, started rocking him."

Medics arrived around 8:41 p.m. but did not begin to assist Nichols until 16minutes later. An ambulance arrived at 9:02 p.m. and took Nichols to St. Francis Hospital at 9:18p.m. after he complained of shortness of breath.

On scene, video footage showed officers issued at least 71 commands over 13 minutes; The New York Times described the orders as "often simultaneous and contradictory" and "sometimes even impossible to obey". The Times cited one such example of many, where an officer shouted "Give me your fucking hands!", meanwhile Nichols had one officer pinning his arms behind his back, a second officer holding his handcuffed wrist, and a third officer punching Nichols' face. One commentator has described the officers' interaction with Nichols as having "started with poor communication" and going downhill from there.

On January 8, the department stated that the traffic stop of Nichols was due to reckless driving. On January 27, Memphis Police Chief Cerelyn J. Davis stated that her department reviewed footage, including from body cameras regarding the traffic stop and the arrest, to "determine what that probable cause was and we have not been able to substantiate that... It doesn't mean that something didn't happen, but there's no proof."

Nichols died in the hospital on January 10.

Charges and actions 

The MPD sent a change of status form, summary of charges, hearing summary, and decertification request to the Tennessee Peace Officers Standards and Training Commission (POST), informing them that the five accused MPD officers were relieved of duty effective January 8, 2023.

MPD Deputy Chief M. Hardy was the Hearing Officer for each of five hearings. In the hearing summary specific to Haley's conduct, Hardy upheld the charge that Haley violated MPD DR 603 INFORMATION CONCERNING POLICE BUSINESS by taking pictures in front of Nichols and sharing the photos with at least six individuals both within the MPD and an acquaintance.    Hardy described each Officers conduct as "unjustly, blatantly unprofessional and unbecoming for a sworn public servant."

On February 14, the Shelby County Sheriff's Office, which is independent of the MPD, announced in a press release, that Sheriff Deputies Jeremy Watkins and Johntavious Bowers were suspended for five days without pay following an internal investigation. County Sheriff Floyd Bonner Jr. said that Watkins and Bowers violated:

 Radio Communication Procedures — Failed to notify dispatchers and supervisor that they responded to the Nichols traffic stop.
 Mobile Video Recording System Procedures — Failed to document their presence at the scene or report the incident in daily activity logs.
 Patrol Field Job Duties and Responsibilities — Failed to activate patrol vehicle's mobile video recording unit ("dash cam")
 Operation Responsibility of Daily Activity Log (Watkins only) — Failed to activate body-worn cameras.

Bonner added he does not expect his deputies to face criminal charges. Both deputies have been in their positions since June 2021.

Investigations

Police report 

A police report was written two hours after Nichols was beaten. The report claimed that at the initial traffic stop Nichols was irate, sweating profusely when he left his vehicle, and he refused to be detained. Pepper spray and a taser were ineffective in controlling Nichols. For the second encounter between Nichols and police, the report claimed that Nichols resisted arrest by grabbing an officer's duty belt and another officer's vest, ignored their orders, leading to officers using pepper spray and striking Nichols with a baton; Nichols was eventually taken into custody after "several verbal" commands.

The released videos did not corroborate the police report's claim that Nichols "started to fight" with officers, or even that he had been violent at all. The released videos also did not corroborate the officers' claim that Nichols reached for their weapons. Seth Stoughton, a law professor and use-of-force expert, noted that an officer typically shouts it out immediately if they see a suspect reach for a weapon, and none did so in the videos of their struggles with Nichols. The initial police report did not state that officers had punched or kicked Nichols.

Autopsy 

No death certificate with an official cause of death for Nichols or an official autopsy report has been issued by the Shelby County medical examiner's office as of February 1, 2023.

Preliminary findings of an autopsy commissioned by his family found that Nichols "suffered excessive bleeding caused by a severe beating".

Dismissals and criminal charges 

On January 7, Shelby County District Attorney Steve Mulroy asked the Tennessee Bureau of Investigation to investigate allegations of excessive use of force during the arrest.

On January 15, MPD announced the officers involved would face administrative action. The U.S. Department of Justice and the Federal Bureau of Investigation (FBI) also opened a civil rights investigation. On January 20, MPD announced that the five officers would be fired.

By January 24, two Memphis Fire Services (MFS) emergency medical technicians (EMTs), Robert Long and JaMichael Sandridge,  who were on scene had been relieved of duty without further explanation. A week later, a total of three MFS employees had been fired the two EMTs and an MFS lieutenant, Michelle Whitakerfor failing to conduct a proper assessment or treatment to Nichols, a break in policies and procedures.

On January 24, the five officers were arrested and charged with second degree murder, aggravated assault, aggravated kidnapping, official misconduct, and official oppression. As of January 27, all five men have posted bail and been released, according to Shelby County Jail records.

On January 30, authorities announced that two other police officers, Preston Hemphill, and an unidentified officer, had also been relieved of duty. On February 3, it was announced that Hemphill had also been fired. Hemphill, who is White, had been involved in the initial traffic stop and tasing but not in the subsequent filmed beating.

Nichols' family retained attorneys Benjamin Crump and Antonio Romanucci.

Grand jury indictments 

On January 26, the Grand Jury of the State of Tennessee indicted the five MPD officers and presented the following findings: murder second degree; aggravated assault; aggravated kidnapping; aggravated kidnapping with a deadly weapon; official misconduct, harming another; official misconduct, refraining from performing a duty imposed by law; official oppression.

Court hearings 

On February 16, the five former MPD officers appeared at the Shelby County Criminal Court and pleaded not guilty to all of their charges.

Aftermath 

After Nichols' death, Chief Davis called for a review of the SCORPION unit, and the unit was disbanded on January 28.

In the weeks after Nichols' death, the The Institute for Public Service Reporting in Memphis reviewed reports that appear to show SCORPION units engaged in "zero-tolerance" or "proactive policing"-type activities. The review revealed that often SCORPION units initiated contact over for minor crimes like a seat belt violation, a tinted window violation, or low-level drug offenses. This tactic tended escalating with the use of aggressive tactics by the police with little supervision.

A GoFundMe campaign was created by family members of Nichols that states "We want to build a memorial skate park for Tyre, in honor of his love for skating and sunsets." , the GoFundMe campaign had raised nearly million.

On the evening of January 31, 2023, a ceremony and press conference with Nichols' family was held at the Mason Temple Church in Memphis, where Martin Luther King Jr. gave his final speech "I've Been to the Mountaintop" in 1968. Nichols' funeral was held the next day at the Mississippi Boulevard Christian Church in Memphis. During the service, U.S. Vice President Kamala Harris and Reverend Al Sharpton called for the approval of the George Floyd Justice in Policing Act and other police reforms.

U.S. Representative Steven Horsford invited Nichols' parents to attend President Joe Biden's 2023 State of the Union Address. Biden discussed the difficulty Black and brown families have when preparing their children for confrontations with the law. For example, Biden said that such families tell their children that when "a police officer pulls you over, turn on your interior lights. Don't reach for your license. Keep your hands on the steering wheel."

According to Biden, Nichols' mother told him her son was "a beautiful soul and something good will come from this". Biden said that society should "Give law enforcement the training they need, hold them to higher standards, and help them succeed in keeping everyone safe."

Protests 

On January 27, the police body-worn camera video footage of the incident was released to the public. Chief Davis stated that officials "decided it would be best to release the video later in the day after schools are dismissed and people are home from work" due to concern over the civil unrest that might result after its release.

Following the release of the video, protesters in Memphis blocked traffic on Interstate 55. By January 28, protests had also occurred in New York City, Chicago, Washington, D.C., Philadelphia, Los Angeles, Portland, Atlanta, San Francisco, Boston, Baltimore, and Newark.

Reactions 

U.S. President Joe Biden spoke with the Nichols family and joined in their call for peaceful protest. Biden also told the family that he would renew a push with Congress to pass the George Floyd Justice in Policing Act to tackle police misconduct.

Various police officers reacted to the death of Tyre Nichols. Police Chief Davis released a video statement where she said, "This is not just a professional failing. This is a failing of basic humanity toward another individual." On January 27, in an appearance on Good Morning America, she said, "In my 36 years, [...] I would have to say I don't think I've ever been more horrified and disgusted, sad" about the video, and it was "still very unclear" as to why the officers stopped Nichols. New York City Police Commissioner Keechant Sewell, denounced what she called "disgraceful actions", while Chicago Police Superintendent, DavidO. Brown, called the video "horrific". On the day of the video's release, FBI Director Christopher Wray said he was appalled by the video, and Patrick Yoes, the national president of the Fraternal Order of Police, stated that "The event as described to us does not constitute legitimate police work or a traffic stop gone wrong. This is a criminal assault under the pretext of law." New York City Mayor Eric Adams, a retired captain from the NYPD, told the press that the White House had briefed him and other mayors on the video ahead of its release and that it would "trigger pain and sadness in many of us. It will make us angry."

A moment of silence was held for Nichols before the NBA basketball game in Minneapolis at the Target Center on January 27 between the Memphis Grizzlies and Minnesota Timberwolves.

The Legal Aid Society of New York City released a statement that included, "We must continue to question the police's role in society, as these incidents frequently recur, and many more happen all the time without being captured on body-worn cameras." On January 29, Senate Judiciary Chair Dick Durbin said, "We need a national conversation about policing in a responsible, constitutional and humane way. These men and women with badges put them on each day and risk their lives for us. I know that, but we also see from these videos horrible conduct by these same officers in unacceptable situations."

The Black Lives Matter Global Network Foundation issued a statement that stated, "Although the media has spent a great amount of time drawing attention to the fact that the police officers are Black as if that is important, let us be clear:  police represent the interest of capitalism and impel state-sanctioned violence. Anyone who works within a system that perpetuates state-sanctioned violence is complicit in upholding white supremacy."

==

See also 

 Lists of killings by law enforcement officers in the United States
 List of killings by law enforcement officers in the United States, January 2023
 Police brutality in the United States

Notes

References

External links 
 State of Tennessee v. Tadarrius Bean, Demetrius Haley, Emmit Martin, Desmond Mills Jr., and Justin Smith

2023 controversies in the United States
2023 deaths
2023 in Tennessee
African-American history in Memphis, Tennessee
Deaths by beating in the United States
Deaths by person in Tennessee
Filmed deaths in the United States
Filmed killings by law enforcement
January 2023 events in the United States
Killings by law enforcement officers in the United States
Law enforcement controversies in the United States
Law enforcement in Tennessee